The 1973 American League Championship Series took place between October 6 and 11, 1973. The Oakland Athletics defeated the Baltimore Orioles, three games to two. Games 1 and 2 were played in Memorial Stadium in Baltimore; Games 3–5 were played at the Oakland Coliseum. It was the second match-up between the two teams in the ALCS.

Summary

Oakland Athletics vs. Baltimore Orioles

Game summaries

Game 1

In Game 1, Jim Palmer spent 16 minutes retiring the side in the top of the first inning. He walked the first two batters and struck out the next three. The Orioles went to work against lefty Vida Blue and his successor, Horacio Piña in the bottom half. Merv Rettenmund singled and Paul Blair walked before Tommy Davis's RBI double put the Orioles up 1–0. Don Baylor then walked and one out later, Earl Williams's two-run single knocked Pina out of the game. Andy Etchebarren was hit by a pitch to load the bases and Mark Belanger's RBI single made it 4–0 Orioles. They added to their lead on Etchebarren's RBI single in the seventh and Baylor's RBI single in the eighth, both with two on off of Blue Moon Odom. It was more than they needed as Palmer pitched a five-hit shutout, striking out 12 A's along the way.

Game 2

The Orioles' ALCS winning streak was snapped at 10 in Game 2. Bert Campaneris led off the game with a home run off of Dave McNally, but the Orioles tied the game in the bottom of the first when Al Bumbry drew to leadoff walk, moved to third on a single and scored on Tommy Davis's groundout. Back-to-back home runs leading off the sixth by Joe Rudi and Sal Bando off of McNally put the A's up 3–1. In the bottom half, the Orioles got back-to-back leadoff singles before Earl Williams's one-out RBI double cut Oakland's lead to 3–2. Bando's second home run of the game in the eighth off of McNally padded Oakland's lead to 5–2. The Orioles hit two singles in the bottom half off of Catfish Hunter, who was relieved by Rollie Fingers and Brooks Robinson's RBI single made it 5–3 Oakland, but they got that run back in the ninth when Angel Mangual hit a leadoff single off of Bob Reynolds, moved to third on a sacrifice bunt and passed ball, and scored on Campaneris's single. Hunter, who served up so many during the season that he threatened an A.L. record, allowed none as the A's evened the series as the two teams headed to Oakland for Game 3.

Game 3

The third game, postponed a day by inclement weather—the postponement trigged a rhubarb between A.L. President Joe Cronin and A's President Charlie Finley—was played at Oakland and produced a brilliant pitching battle between a pair of southpaws, Mike Cuellar of Baltimore and Ken Holtzman. Up to that point, Cuellar had allowed only three hits. he had a one-hit shutout for the first seven innings as he carefully nursed a 1–0 lead given him by Earl Williams' homer in the second inning. But in the eighth, pinch-hitter Jesús Alou singled and pinch-runner Allan Lewis was sacrificed to second by Mike Andrews. The play was controversial in that Cuellar appeared to have a force out at second base, but he ignored catcher Etchebarren's yells and took the safe out at first. This proved costly as, one out later, Joe Rudi singled home Lewis to tie the score. Bert Campaneris, first man up in the 11th, snapped a 1–1 tie by hitting Cuellar's second pitch over the left-field fence for a home run.

Game 4

In Game 4, The A's knocked out Jim Palmer with a three-run outburst in the second inning. After a leadoff double and subsequent single, Ray Fosse's double scored two and Dick Green's double scored another. The A's made it 4–0 in the sixth on Fosse's bases-loaded sacrifice fly off of Bob Reynolds. Vida Blue pitched six shutout innings before falling apart in the seventh. Earl Williams drew a base on balls with one out and Don Baylor followed with a single. Brooks Robinson came through with a run-producing single and Andy Etchebarren hit the next pitch for a home run, making the score 4–4. The next inning, Bobby Grich hit a home run off Rollie Fingers and that, coupled with Grant Jackson's stout relief pitching, gave the game to the Orioles.

Game 5

A surprisingly small crowd of 24,265 showed up for the final game and they saw Catfish Hunter pitch a five-hit shutout, winning 3–0. The A's first run in the game come in the third inning when Ray Fosse reached first on an error by third baseman Brooks Robinson, moved to second on a sacrifice bunt, and scored on a single by Joe Rudi. Right-hander Doyle Alexander lasted only until the fourth inning. In that frame he was the victim of a single by Gene Tenace, who scored on a triple by Vic Davalillo before Jesus Alou added an RBI single. He was relieved by Palmer, who shut out Oakland the rest of the way, but the Orioles were helpless against Hunter's powerful pitching as the A's advanced to the World Series.

Pitching dominated the 5-game set, the victorious A's batting only .200 while the O's hit just .211.

Composite box
1973 ALCS (3–2): Oakland A's over Baltimore Orioles

References

External links
1973 ALCS at Baseball-Reference.com

American League Championship Series
American League Championship Series
Oakland Athletics postseason
Baltimore Orioles postseason
American League Championship Series
American League Championship Series
1970s in Baltimore
20th century in Oakland, California
American League Championship Series